The 1979–80 Maryland Terrapins men's basketball team represented the University of Maryland as a member of the Atlantic Coast Conference during the 1979–80 men's college basketball season. The team was led by head coach Lefty Driesell and played their home games at Cole Field House in College Park, Maryland. The Terrapins finished the season with a 24–7 overall record (11–3 ACC), won the ACC regular season title, and reached the Sweet Sixteen of the NCAA tournament before losing to Georgetown.

Roster

Schedule

|-
!colspan=9 style=| Regular season

|-
!colspan=9 style=|

|-
!colspan=9 style=|

Rankings

References

Maryland Terrapins men's basketball seasons
Maryland
Maryland
Maryland
Maryland